This is a list of computer programs that are predominantly used for molecular mechanics calculations.

See also

Car–Parrinello molecular dynamics
Comparison of force-field implementations
Comparison of nucleic acid simulation software
List of molecular graphics systems
List of protein structure prediction software
List of quantum chemistry and solid-state physics software
List of software for Monte Carlo molecular modeling
List of software for nanostructures modeling
Molecular design software
Molecular dynamics
Molecular modeling on GPUs
Molecule editor

Notes and references

External links
SINCRIS
Linux4Chemistry
Collaborative Computational Project
World Index of Molecular Visualization Resources
Short list of Molecular Modeling resources
OpenScience
Biological Magnetic Resonance Data Bank
Materials modelling and computer simulation codes
A few tips on molecular dynamics
atomistic.software - atomistic simulation engines and their citation trends

Computational chemistry software
Computational chemistry
Software comparisons
Molecular dynamics software
Molecular modelling software
Science software